Myg of the planet Lythyl is a fictional character, a superhero in the future of the DC Comics universe. He is a master of every form of martial arts to have been developed by the 30th and 31st centuries. Following in the footsteps of Val Armorr, he became the second individual to assume the identity Karate Kid, and briefly served as a member of the Legion of Super-Heroes.

Fictional character biography
In accordance with the terms of Val Armorr's will, Timber Wolf and Sensei Toshiaki travel to the planet Lythyl. They meet with Lythyl's ruling council – the Three Judges – which includes a teenager named Myg. After engaging the pair in a test of hand-to-hand combat skills, Myg is knocked unconscious by Timber Wolf and Sensei. They smuggle the teen off Lythyl, so that the planet will not corrupt him as it corrupted Val Armorr's father Kirau Nezumi (the Black Dragon). Myg is brought to Val Armorr’s resting place on Shanghalla. Humbled by the level of respect given to Val even in death, Myg vows to follow in his path. He adopts the Karate Kid name and enrolls in the Legion Academy. Subsequently, he enjoins a brief stint in the Legion of Substitute Heroes.

Post-Infinite Crisis
At some point, Myg joins the Legion of Super-Heroes. He later becomes disillusioned by the discord between several of the Legionnaires, particularly Shrinking Violet and Chameleon Girl.  Years later, he becomes Lythyl's representative to the United Planets Council, and soon advocates the disbanding of the Legion.  Ultimately, he is murdered by Radiation Roy during an attack on the U.P. Council by the so-called "Justice League of Earth".

Powers and abilities
Like his predecessor Val Armorr, Myg has achieved mastery of every documented form of martial arts to have been developed by the 30th and 31st centuries. He possesses the ability to sense the weakest spot in an object and his skill in hand-to-hand combat is seemingly superhuman, allowing him to simulate super-strength blows. He can severely damage extremely hard and strong materials — metals, stone, etc. — with a single blow.

References

Characters created by Paul Levitz
DC Comics titles
DC Comics martial artists
DC Comics superheroes
Comics characters introduced in 1985
Fictional karateka

pt:Karate Kid (DC Comics)